Vrhovac is a surname. Notable people with the surname include:

Aleksandar Vrhovac (born 1972), Bosnia and Herzegovina footballer
Maksimilijan Vrhovac (1752–1827), Croatian Roman Catholic bishop
Vedran Vrhovac, (born 1998), Bosnian professional footballer

Serbian surnames
Croatian surnames